International School for Business and Social Studies (ISSBS, Slovene: Mednarodna fakulteta za družbene in poslovne študije) is a university located in Celje, Slovenia. The university offers both undergraduate and post-graduate courses.

Courses 
Some of the courses offered by the university are: 
 Economics in Contemporary Society
 Business in Contemporary Society
 Knowledge Management
 Management and Quality in Education
 Human Resource Management

References

External links 
 

Universities in Slovenia
Business schools in Slovenia
Celje